Patrick Christopher Eilers (born September 3, 1966) is a former American football safety in the National Football League (NFL) for the Minnesota Vikings, Washington Redskins, and Chicago Bears.  He played college football at the University of Notre Dame and was a member of the 1988 Fighting Irish team, which won a national championship.  

He graduated with degrees in biology and mechanical engineering in 1989 and 1990, respectively from Notre Dame.  Prior to attending Notre Dame, he spent his first year of university at Yale, where he was a member of the Yale Bulldogs football team.  Furthermore, after the end of his playing career in the NFL, he earned a Master of Business Administration from Northwestern University's Kellogg School of Management.

Eilers is currently the founder and managing partner of Transition Equity Partners (TEP), a private equity firm investing in energy & digital companies. Prior to founding TEP in 2020, Eilers was a managing director within BlackRock's infrastructure Investment Group, and headed the firms corporate equity and special situation investments within the conventional power industry. Prior to BlackRock, Eilers served as a managing director of Madison Dearborn Partners, LLC and oversaw its energy, power and chemicals practice. Pat worked at Madison Dearborn Partners from 1999 to 2015.

References

External links
 

1966 births
Living people
American football safeties
Chicago Bears players
Notre Dame Fighting Irish football players
Minnesota Vikings players
Washington Redskins players
Madison Dearborn Partners
Private equity and venture capital investors
Players of American football from Saint Paul, Minnesota
Yale Bulldogs football players
Yale University alumni
Notre Dame College of Arts and Letters alumni
Northwestern University alumni
Notre Dame College of Engineering alumni